Phaenonotum is a genus of water scavenger beetles in the family Hydrophilidae. There are about nine described species in Phaenonotum.

Species
These nine species belong to the genus Phaenonotum:
 Phaenonotum apicale Sharp, 1882
 Phaenonotum collare Sharp, 1882
 Phaenonotum delgadoi Deler-Hernández, Cala-Riquelme & Fikáček, 2013
 Phaenonotum exstriatum (Say, 1835)
 Phaenonotum globulosum (Mulsant, 1844)
 Phaenonotum meridionale d'Orchymont
 Phaenonotum minus Smetana, 1978
 Phaenonotum rotundulum Sharp, 1882
 Phaenonotum tarsale Sharp, 1882

References

Further reading

 

Hydrophilidae
Articles created by Qbugbot